American Automotive Equipment, also known as AAE, is a United States-based manufacturer, distributor, and seller of automotive service equipment.  A privately held company, AAE is headquartered in Port Chester, New York.

History
AAE was founded in 1969 as MZE, Inc. in the Northeastern United States as a distributor and service center for various manufacturers of automotive lifts and service equipment in the undercar sector.

 AAE manufactured, distributed, and sold auto service equipment around the world.  Its primary products included automotive lifts, wheel balancers, and tire changers. AAE claims a customer base 
of over 100,000 companies and individuals.

In 2004 AAE's U.S.-based manufacturing processes were internationalized.  Three overseas cooperative ventures were established, tripling production capacity.

AAE's primary logistics facility is in Cleburne, Texas.

References

External links
 Hydraulic Lifts
 American Automotive Equipment company website

1969 establishments in New York (state)
American companies established in 1969
Automotive companies established in 1969
Auto parts suppliers of the United States
Manufacturing companies based in New York (state)
Companies based in Westchester County, New York
Port Chester, New York